Jose Antonio Toledo Valle ( – ) was a famous football player and manager from El Salvador.

Career
Born in the district of Zacatecoluca, He went on the play for clubs in El Salvador and Mexico.

He made his debut for Albinegros de Orizaba in 1942-43 Copa Mexico match, although Antonio scored, the club went on to lose 3-1 against  Veracruz .

International
He played for the El Salvador in the Campeonato Centroamericano y del Caribe 1941 tournament playing three games and scoring all three goals against Nicaragua.
Though he did play for the national team in three unofficial games against Alajuelense in 1940.

Achievement
He has a stadium named after him Estadio Antonio Toledo Valle at his home district of Zacateccoluca.

References

External links
El Salvador en Copa CCCF y NORCECA Campeonato Centroamericano y del Caribe y Copa CONCACAF - El Balón Cuscatleco 

1910s births
2000s deaths

Year of birth uncertain
Year of death uncertain
People from La Paz Department (El Salvador)
Association football midfielders
Salvadoran footballers
Salvadoran expatriate footballers
Expatriate footballers in Mexico